Vargas & Lagola are a Swedish songwriting and production duo of Vincent Pontare and Salem Al Fakir.

They have worked with many artists, including Avicii, Axwell & Ingrosso, David Guetta, Galantis, Madonna and Seinabo Sey. In addition to their songwriting and production work, they release alternative pop music.

Career

Vincent Pontare and Salem Al Fakir have gone from successful solo artists to Swedish Grammy Award winning songwriters and producers.
Among the first co-writes together are Avicii’s 2013 Billboard Hot 100 single "Hey Brother" and "Younger" by Seinabo Sey.

At the 2014 Swedish Grammy Awards Vargas & Lagola and Magnus Lidehäll were awarded Composer of the Year after writing for Veronica Maggio’s album Handen i fickan fast jag bryr mig and the Petter album Början på allt, and work with artists like Galantis.  In 2014 they wrote numerous songs on Mapei’s album Hey Hey and Avicii’s "The Days" and "Divine Sorrow" (with Wyclef Jean).
Vargas & Lagola followed up with another successful year in 2015 co-writing most songs on Seinabo Sey’s highly acclaimed debut album Pretend and songs for Madonna’s Rebel Heart album.

Vargas & Lagola have co-written some of the biggest hits by Axwell Ʌ Ingrosso – "More Than You Know", "Sun Is Shining", "Dreamer" and more - taken from their 2017 album More Than You Know.

The duo have also contributed to two songs on Swedish rock band Ghost's Billboard 200-charting and Grammy Award-nominated album Prequelle, including the album's second single "Dance Macabre" which topped Billboard's Mainstream Rock Chart.

In 2018, the same moment as Vargas & Lagola blazed onto the alternative pop scene with the hit single "Roads", they shared the no.1 spot as Sweden's most streamed songwriters for songs including Avicii – "Without You (feat. Sandro Cavazza)" and "Waiting For Love". 
After working closely with Avicii for several years, Al Fakir and Pontare played a key role in finishing up the 2019 posthumous Avicii album TIM and are featured artists on three of the album songs. On 5 December 2019, Vargas & Lagola performed at Avicii’s Tribute Concert in Stockholm.

Vargas & Lagola's debut album The Butterfly Effect was released in January 2020.

Discography

Albums

Singles

As lead artist 

Notes

As featured artist

Songwriting and production credits

Songwriting and production credits for local Swedish artists

Awards and nominations

References

External links
 

English-language singers from Sweden
Living people
Musical groups from Stockholm County
Swedish composers
Swedish electronic music groups
Swedish musical duos
Swedish songwriters
Songwriting teams
Record production duos
Year of birth missing (living people)